The Courtenay barony was created in 1299, when Hugh de Courtenay was summoned to Parliament, thus becoming the first Baron Courtenay. He was subsequently made Earl of Devon in 1335.  During his life, his son Hugh de Courtenay the younger, was summoned as 2nd Baron Courtenay in 1337, with the barony coming to represent a courtesy title for the heir of the Earls of Devon.  This Hugh succeeded as Earl on his father's death in 1340, and since his own son, also Hugh, died in 1348 without having been summoned as baron, it was Earl Hugh's grandson, yet another Hugh, who was summoned as 3rd Baron Courtenay in 1371, during his grandfather's life. He died three years later, and on the Earl's 1377 death, both the Earldom of Devon and the Barony of Courtenay passed to another grandson, Edward de Courtenay, first cousin of the previous courtesy holder of the barony.  Though his son Edward would be styled 'Lord Courtenay' during his father's lifetime, he was never summoned under the courtesy title and he predeceased his father, so the earldom and barony devolved on the Earl's younger son, Hugh de Courtenay, 4th/12th Earl of Devon and 5th Baron Courtenay.  Both titles then passed together for two generations, but in 1461, Thomas Courtenay, 6th/14th Earl of Devon and 7th Baron, was attainted and executed, and the barony forfeited.

Barons Courtenay
 Hugh de Courtenay, 1st/9th Earl of Devon, 1st Baron Courtenay (1275 or 1276-1340), summoned 1299
 Hugh de Courtenay, 2nd/10th Earl of Devon, 2nd Baron Courtenay (d. 1377), summoned 1337
 Hugh de Courtenay, 3rd Baron Courtenay, (d. 1374), summoned 1371
 Edward de Courtenay, 3rd/11th Earl of Devon, 3rd/11th Earl of Devon, 4th Baron Courtenay (c.1357-1419)
Edward de Courtenay (ca.1388-1419), styled Lord Courtenay but never summoned
 Hugh de Courtenay, 4th/12th Earl of Devon, 5th Baron Courtenay (1389-1422)
 Thomas de Courtenay, 5th/13th Earl of Devon, 6th Baron Courtenay (1414-1458)
 Thomas Courtenay, 6th/14th Earl of Devon, 7th Baron Courtenay (1432-1461)

References

Bibliography 
 
 

1299 establishments in England

Forfeited baronies in the Peerage of England
Noble titles created in 1299